Opus 217. Against the Enamel of a Background Rhythmic with Beats and Angles, Tones, and Tints, Portrait of M. Félix Fénéon in 1890 is an 1890 oil painting by French artist Paul Signac.  The Neo-impressionist work depicts the French art critic Félix Fénéon standing in front of a swirling coloured background.  It has been held by the Museum of Modern Art in New York since 1991.

The work is a left profile portrait of Fénéon, with his characteristic goatee beard, wearing a brown coat with black suit and white shirt, holding a black top hat and walking cane in his left hand, and delicately a cyclamen flower in the fingers of his outstretched right hand.  The angles of Fénéon's head, arm, elbow, and cane, create a zigzag pattern down the right hand side of the painting, while the curved stem and petals of the flower echo the upward curve of Fénéon's goatee.  Signac made the portrait from a pencil drawing and oil sketch of the subject, but without long sittings.  Its composition may draw from an 1890 gouache portrait of Signac by Georges Seurat, in which Signac is depicted wearing a top hat and carrying a cane.  

The swirling patterns in the background create a kaleidoscopic colour wheel with abstract designs in eight sectors meeting at a central point, contrasting with the foreground figurative portrait of Fénéon and the flower.  The choice of a cyclamen may be a visual pun referring to colour cycle in the background.  The background may have been inspired by a Japanese wood block print of the 1860s, perhaps a kimono pattern, which was in Signac's gallery.  It is probably also a reference to the aesthetic theories of Charles Henry, whose 1885 book Introduction à une esthétique scientifique influenced Signac and Seurat.  Henry's book on colour theory and the "algebra" of visual rhythm (which proposed a deterministic and calculable link between outer stimuli and psychic reaction) was illustrated by Signac, 1890, either  Application de nouveaux instruments de précision (cercle chromatique, rapporteur et triple décimètre esthétiques) a l'archéologie.  The exceedingly long title of the painting may be intended as a joke at Henry's scientific pretentions.  All three were still in their youth: in 1890, Signac celebrated his 27th birthday, Fénéon turned 29, and Henry 31.

By this time, the free brushstrokes of Impressionism were being succeeded by the more deliberate and scientific approach of Divisionism or Pointillism, championed by Seurat and Signac, painting with small contrasting coloured dots based on an understanding of colour theory with the intention that the pure colours would be combined in the viewer's eye and mind to create a more vivid work.  Unlike many art critics, Fénéon was a supporter of Seurat and Signac, naming their artistic approach Neo-impressionism.

The painting measures .  In the lower corners are the title, "OP. 217" and the artist's signature and the date, "P. Signac 90".  It was exhibited at the Salon des Indépendents in 1891, but was not well received by most critics, who considered that the background dominated the portrait figure.  Signac gave the painting to Fénéon, who kept it until his death in 1944.  Artworks from Fénéon's estate were sold at the Hôtel Drouot in 1947, and funds used by his widow to establish the Prix Fénéon, literary and art prizes.  

The painting was part donated to the Museum of Modern Art in New York by Peggy Rockefeller and David Rockefeller in 1991.

See also
List of paintings by Paul Signac

References
 Paul Signac. Opus 217. Against the Enamel of a Background Rhythmic with Beats and Angles, Tones, and Tints, Portrait of M. Félix Fénéon in 1890. 1890, Museum of Modern Art
 The Neo-Impressionist Portrait, 1886–1904, Jane Block, Ellen Wardwell Lee, ING Cultuurcentrum, Indianapolis Museum of Art, p. 147
 Neo-Impressionism and the Dream of Realities: Painting, Poetry, Music, Cornelia Homburg, pp. 5, 55, 89
 MoMA Highlights: 350 Works from The Museum of Modern Art, New York, Museum of Modern Art (New York, N.Y.), p. 16

External links

Paintings by Paul Signac
1890 paintings
Paintings in the collection of the Museum of Modern Art (New York City)